Peter Ndegwa may refer to:
Peter Ndegwa (business executive)
Khalid Kamal Yaseen, born Peter Ndegwa, Bahraini long-distance runner